Pharoh Cooper (born March 7, 1995) is an American football wide receiver for the Arizona Cardinals of the National Football League (NFL). He played college football at South Carolina, and was drafted by the Los Angeles Rams in the fourth round of the 2016 NFL Draft. He has also played for the Cincinnati Bengals, Arizona Cardinals, and Carolina Panthers.

Early years
Cooper's father, grandfather, and brother all served in the Marine Corps. Cooper attended Havelock High School in Havelock, North Carolina. He played quarterback, wide receiver, running back, and defensive back. He was rated by Rivals.com as a four-star recruit. He committed to the University of South Carolina to play college football.

College career
Cooper attended and played college football for the University of South Carolina. He was originally  a defensive back before moving to wide receiver prior to the start of his freshman season. He played in 11 of 13 games his freshman season. He had three receptions for 54 receiving yards, 202 rushing yards, one rushing touchdown and also completed two of three pass attempts for 29 yards and a touchdown. Against Tennessee during his sophomore year in 2014, Cooper set the school single-game receiving yards record with 233. In the 2014 Independence Bowl against the Miami Hurricanes, he had nine receptions for 170 yards and a touchdown and was named the game's MVP. For the season, Cooper appeared in all 13 games and was named first team All-SEC after recording 69 receptions for 1,136 yards and nine touchdowns. He also ran for 200 yards with two rushing touchdowns and passed for 78 yards and two touchdowns. As a junior in 2015, Cooper had 873 receiving yards along with 111 rushing yards with 9 total touchdowns. He also had 55 return yards on 12 punt return opportunities. After his junior year, he announced his intentions to enter the 2016 NFL Draft.

Professional career

Los Angeles Rams

Cooper was drafted by the Los Angeles Rams in the fourth round with the 117th overall pick in the 2016 NFL Draft. On June 9, 2016, Cooper signed a four-year contract with the team. He played in 10 games with three starts in his rookie season, recording 14 receptions for 106 yards while fulfilling kick return and occasional punt return duties.

Following a 16–10 loss to Seattle in Week 5 of 2017, Cooper replaced a struggling Tavon Austin as the Rams' primary return man. In Week 6 of the 2017 season, Cooper scored the first NFL touchdown of his career with a 103-yard kick return touchdown to start the game in a 27–17 win over the Jacksonville Jaguars, earning him NFC Special Teams Player of the Week honors. On December 19, 2017, Cooper was selected to the 2018 Pro Bowl as a return specialist.

On September 12, 2018, Cooper was placed on injured reserve after suffering an ankle injury in Week 1. He was activated off injured reserve on November 19, 2018. On December 18, 2018, Cooper was released by the Rams.

Arizona Cardinals
On December 19, 2018, Cooper was claimed off waivers by the Arizona Cardinals. Appearing in two games, he returned six punts for 67 yards.

On August 30, 2019, Cooper was released by the Cardinals.

Cincinnati Bengals
On September 1, 2019, Cooper was claimed off waivers by the Cincinnati Bengals. He saw limited action in the Bengals' season-opening 21–20 loss at the Seattle Seahawks, but recorded no receptions or yards. After being inactive for Week 2's game against the San Francisco 49ers, Cooper was waived on September 17, 2019.

Arizona Cardinals (second stint)
On October 1, 2019, Cooper was re-signed by the Arizona Cardinals.

Carolina Panthers
On March 20, 2020, Cooper signed a one-year contract with the Carolina Panthers.

Jacksonville Jaguars
On June 3, 2021, Cooper signed a contract with the Jacksonville Jaguars. He was released on August 31, 2021.

New York Giants
On November 3, 2021, Cooper was signed to the New York Giants practice squad. For Week 9 game against the Las Vegas Raiders Cooper was elevated from the practice squad. Cooper was activated from the practice squad as a COVID-19 replacement for the games against the Tampa Bay Buccaneers and the Philadelphia Eagles. On December 4, 2021, Cooper was elevated from the practice squad for the game against the Miami Dolphins. On December 11, 2021, Cooper was activated from the practice squad as a COVID-19 replacement for the game against the Los Angeles Chargers. His contract expired when the team’s season ended on January 9, 2022.

Arizona Cardinals (third stint)
On November 23, 2022, the Arizona Cardinals signed Cooper to their practice squad. He was promoted to the active roster on December 28, 2022.

NFL career statistics

Regular season

Postseason

References

External links
 Carolina Panthers bio
 South Carolina Gamecocks bio

1995 births
Living people
African-American players of American football
American football return specialists
American football running backs
American football wide receivers
People from Havelock, North Carolina
Players of American football from North Carolina
South Carolina Gamecocks football players
Los Angeles Rams players
Arizona Cardinals players
Cincinnati Bengals players
National Conference Pro Bowl players
Carolina Panthers players
Jacksonville Jaguars players
21st-century African-American sportspeople
New York Giants players